

Events

January

 January 4 – U.S. President Jimmy Carter proclaims a grain embargo against the USSR with the support of the European Commission.
 January 6 – Global Positioning System time epoch begins at 00:00 UTC.
 January 9 – In Saudi Arabia, 63 Islamist insurgents are beheaded for their part in the siege of the Great Mosque in Mecca in November 1979.
 January 14 – Indira Gandhi returns to power as Prime Minister of India.
 January 20 – At least 200 people are killed when the Corralejas Bullring collapses at Sincelejo, Colombia.
 January 21 – The London Gold Fixing hits its highest price ever of $843 per troy ounce ($2,249.50 in 2020 when adjusted for inflation).
 January 22 – Andrei Sakharov, Soviet scientist and human rights activist, is arrested in Moscow.
 January 26 – Israel and Egypt establish diplomatic relations.
 January 27 – Canadian Caper: Six United States diplomats, posing as Canadians, manage to escape from Tehran, Iran, as they board a flight to Zürich, Switzerland, on Swissair.
 January 31 – Burning of the Spanish Embassy in Guatemala: The Spanish Embassy in Guatemala is invaded and set on fire, killing 36 people. In the United States, it is dubbed "Spain's own Tehran".

February 

 February 2 – Abscam: FBI personnel target members of the Congress of the United States in a sting operation.
 February 2 – 3 – The New Mexico State Penitentiary riot takes place; 33 inmates are killed and more than 100 inmates injured.
 February 4 – Abolhassan Banisadr is sworn in as the first President of Iran after winning the January 25 presidential election.
 February 13 – The 1980 Winter Olympics open in Lake Placid, New York.
 February 15 – In Vanuatu, followers of John Frum's cargo cult on the island of Tanna declare secession as the nation of Tafea.
 February 16 – A total solar eclipse is seen in North Africa and West Asia. It was the 50th solar eclipse of Solar Saros 130.
 February 22 - The United States Olympic hockey team defeats the Soviet Union, 4 to 3, in the semifinals of the 1980 Winter Olympics, in what is considered to be the greatest moment in sports history which then became known as the Miracle on Ice.
 February 23 – Ayatollah Ruhollah Khomeini states that Iran's parliament will decide the fate of the American embassy hostages.
 February 25 – A coup in Suriname ousts the government of Henck Arron; leaders Dési Bouterse and Roy Horb replace it with a National Military Council.
 February 27 – M-19 guerrillas begin the Dominican embassy siege in Colombia, holding 60 people hostage, including 14 ambassadors.

March

 March 1
 The Commonwealth Trade Union Council is established.
 The Voyager 1 probe confirms the existence of Janus, a moon of Saturn.
 March 3 - Pierre Trudeau returns to office as Prime Minister of Canada.
 March 4 – Robert Mugabe is elected Prime Minister of Zimbabwe.
 March 8 – The Soviet Union's first rock music festival starts.
 March 14 – LOT Polish Airlines Flight 007 crashes during an emergency landing near Warsaw, Poland, killing a 14-man American boxing team and 73 others.
 March 18 – Fifty people are killed at the Plesetsk Cosmodrome in Russia, when a Vostok-2M rocket explodes on its launch pad during a fueling operation.
 March 19 – 20 – The , the ship housing pirate radio station Radio Caroline, sinks off the English coast (the station returns aboard a new ship in 1983).
 March 21 – U.S. President Jimmy Carter announces that the United States will boycott the 1980 Summer Olympics in Moscow because of the Soviet invasion of Afghanistan.
 March 26 – A mine lift cage at the Vaal Reefs gold mine in South Africa falls , killing 23 workers.
 March 27 – The Norwegian oil platform Alexander L. Kielland collapses in the North Sea, killing 123 of its crew of 212.
 March 28 – The Talpiot Tomb is discovered by construction workers in Jerusalem.

April 

 April 1 – The Southern African Development Coordination Conference (SADCC) is formed in Lusaka, Zambia.
 April 2 – The St Pauls riot breaks out in Bristol.
 April 7 – The United States severs diplomatic relations with Iran and imposes economic sanctions, following the taking of American hostages on November 4, 1979.
 April 10 – In Lisbon, Portugal, the governments of Spain and the United Kingdom agree to reopen the border between Gibraltar and Spain in 1985, closed since 1969.
 April 12
1980 Liberian coup d'état: Samuel K. Doe overthrows the government of Liberia in a violent coup d'état, assassinating President William Tolbert and 26 other people and ending over 130 years of democratic presidential succession in that country.
 Terry Fox begins his Marathon of Hope, a plan to run across Canada to raise money for cancer research, setting off from St. Johns, Newfoundland and running westward.
 April 14 – Iron Maiden's debut self-titled album Iron Maiden is released in the U.K.
 April 18 – Zimbabwe gains de jure independence from the United Kingdom with Robert Mugabe as its first Prime Minister.
 April 24 – 25 – Operation Eagle Claw, a commando mission in Iran to rescue American embassy hostages, is aborted after mechanical problems ground the rescue helicopters. Eight United States troops are killed in a mid-air collision during the failed operation.
 April 25 – Dan-Air Flight 1008 crashes in Tenerife, killing all 146 occupants; at the time it was the worst air disaster involving a British-registered aircraft in terms of loss of life.
 April 26 – Louise and Charmian Faulkner disappear from outside their flat in St Kilda, Victoria, Australia.
 April 27 – The Dominican embassy siege in Colombia ends with all remaining hostages released after the guerrillas are allowed to escape to Cuba.
 April 30
 Iranian Embassy siege: Six Iranian-born terrorists take over the Iranian embassy in London, England. SAS retakes the Embassy on May 5; one terrorist survives.
 Queen Juliana of the Netherlands abdicates and her daughter Beatrix accedes to the throne.

May

 May 1 – "About that Urban Renaissance...", an article by journalist Dan Rottenberg in Chicago, contains the first recorded use of the word "yuppie".
 May 2 – Referendum on system of government held in Nepal.
 May 4 – Yugoslav President Josip Broz Tito dies. The largest state funeral in history is organized, with state delegations from 128 different countries out of 154 UN members at the time.
 May 7 – Paul Geidel, convicted of second-degree murder in 1911, is released from prison in Beacon, New York, after 68 years and 245 days (the longest-ever time served by an inmate).
 May 8 – Global eradication of smallpox certified by the World Health Organization.
 May 9
 In Florida, United States, the Liberian freighter Summit Venture hits the Sunshine Skyway Bridge over Tampa Bay. A  section of the bridge collapses and 35 people (most in a bus) are killed.
 James Alexander George Smith "Jags" McCartney the Turks and Caicos Islands' first chief minister, is killed in a plane crash over New Jersey.
 May 14 – The Sumpul River massacre occurs in Chalatenango, El Salvador. 
 May 17 – Internal conflict in Peru: On the eve of presidential elections, Maoist guerrilla group Shining Path attacks a polling location in the town of Chuschi, Ayacucho.
 May 18 – The 1980 eruption of Mount St. Helens volcano in Washington (state) kills 57 and causes US$3 billion in damage.
 May 18 – 27 – Gwangju Uprising: Students in Gwangju, South Korea, begin demonstrations, calling for democratic reforms.
 May 20 – 1980 Quebec referendum: Voters in Quebec reject by a vote of 60%, a proposal to seek independence from Canada.
 May 22 – Namco's Pac-Man, the highest-earning arcade game of all time, is released in Japan.
 May 24
 The International Court of Justice calls for the release of U.S. Embassy hostages in Tehran.
 The New York Islanders win their first Stanley Cup, on a goal by Bobby Nystrom in Game 6 overtime of the 1980 Stanley Cup Finals over the Philadelphia Flyers.
 May 25 – Indianapolis 500: Johnny Rutherford wins for a third time in car owner Jim Hall's revolutionary ground effect Chaparral car; the victory is Hall's second as an owner.
 May 26
 John Frum supporters in Vanuatu storm government offices on the island of Tanna. Vanuatu government troops land the next day and drive them away.
 In South Korea, military government forces and pro-democracy protesters clash; 2,000 protesters die.
 May 28 – A fiery bus crash near the small village of Webb, Saskatchewan, Canada, claims 22 lives.

June

 June 1 – The first 24-hour news channel, Cable News Network (CNN) is launched.
 June 3 – 1980 Grand Island tornado outbreak: A series of deadly tornadoes strikes Grand Island, Nebraska, causing over $300m in damage, killing five people and injuring over 250.
 June 10 – Apartheid: The African National Congress in South Africa publishes a statement by their imprisoned leader Nelson Mandela.
 June 23 – September 6 – The 1980 United States heat wave claims 1,700 lives.
 June 23
 Sanjay Gandhi, the politically influential son of prime minister Indira Gandhi, is killed in a plane crash.
 Tim Berners-Lee begins work on ENQUIRE, the system that will eventually lead to the creation of the World Wide Web in autumn 1990.
 June 25 – A Muslim Brotherhood assassination attempt against Syrian president Hafez al-Assad fails. Assad retaliates by sending the army against them.
 June 27
 Itavia Flight 870 crashes into the sea near Ustica island, Italy, killing all 81 people on board. The cause of the accident remains unclear.
 U.S. President Jimmy Carter signs Proclamation 4771, requiring 18- to 25-year-old males to register for a peacetime military draft, in response to the Soviet invasion of Afghanistan.
 June 29 – Vigdís Finnbogadóttir is elected President of Iceland, making her the first woman democratically elected as head of state.

July

 July 8 – A wave of strikes begins in Lublin, Poland.
 July 9 – Pope John Paul II visits Brazil; seven people are crushed to death in a crowd waiting to see him at afternoon Mass at the stadium in Fortaleza.
 July 16 – Former California Governor and actor Ronald Reagan is nominated for U.S. president, at the 1980 Republican National Convention in Detroit. Influenced by the Religious Right, the convention also drops its long-standing support for the Equal Rights Amendment, dismaying moderate Republicans.
 July 19 – Former Turkish Prime Minister Nihat Erim is killed by two gunmen in Istanbul, Turkey.
 July 19 – August 3 – The 1980 Summer Olympics are held in Moscow, Soviet Union. 82 countries boycott the Games, athletes from 16 of them participate under a neutral flag.
 July 25 – The album Back in Black is released by the Australian band AC/DC.
 July 27 – Mohammad Reza Pahlavi, deposed Shah of Iran, dies in Cairo.
 July 30
 Vanuatu gains independence.
 Israel's Knesset passes the Jerusalem Law.

August 

 August 1 – Vigdís Finnbogadóttir becomes the 4th President of Iceland, the world's first democratically directly elected female president.
 August 2 – Strage di Bologna: A terrorist bombing at the Bologna Centrale railway station in Italy kills 85 people and wounds more than 200.
 August 3 - The 1980 Summer Olympics in Moscow officially ends.
 August 4 – Hurricane Allen (category 5) pounds Haiti, where it kills more than 200 people. 
 August 7–31 – Lech Wałęsa leads the first of many strikes at the Gdańsk Shipyard in the Polish People's Republic.
 August 17 – In Australia, baby Azaria Chamberlain disappears from a campsite at Ayers Rock (Uluru), reportedly taken by a dingo.
 August 19 – In one of aviation's worst disasters, 301 people are killed when Saudia Flight 163 catches fire in Riyadh, Saudi Arabia.
 August 31 – Victory of the strike in Gdańsk Shipyard, Poland. The Gdańsk Agreement is signed, opening a way to start the first free (i.e. not state-controlled) trade union in the communist bloc, "Solidarity" (Solidarność).

September

 September 1 – Terry Fox is forced to end his Marathon of Hope run outside of Thunder Bay, Ontario, Canada, after finding out that the cancer has spread to his lungs.
 September 2 – Ford Europe launches the Escort MK3, a new front-wheel drive hatchback.
 September 3 – Zimbabwe breaks diplomatic and consular relations with South Africa, even though it maintains a commercial mission in Johannesburg.
 September 12 – Kenan Evren stages a military coup in Turkey. It stops political gang violence, but begins stronger state violence leading to the execution of many young activists.
 September 17 – After weeks of strikes at the Lenin Shipyard in Gdańsk, Poland, the nationwide independent trade union Solidarity is established.
 September 21 – Bülent Ulusu, ex admiral, forms the new government of Turkey (44th government, composed mostly of technocrats).
 September 22 – The command council of Iraq orders its army to "deliver its fatal blow on Iranian military targets", initiating the Iran–Iraq War.
 September 26
 Oktoberfest bombing: 13 people are killed and 211 injured in a right-wing terror attack in Munich (West Germany).
 The Mariel boatlift in Cuba officially ends.
 September 30 – Digital Equipment Corporation, Intel and Xerox introduce the DIX standard for Ethernet, which is the first implementation outside of Xerox and the first to support 10 Mbit/s speeds.

October

 October 5 
 The Elisabeth blast furnace is demolished at Bilston Steelworks, marking the end of iron and steel production in the Black Country region of the UK.
 British Leyland launches its new Metro, a three-door entry-level hatchback which is designed as the eventual replacement for the Mini. It gives BL a long-awaited modern competitor for the likes of the Ford Fiesta and Vauxhall Chevette.
 October 10 – The 7.1  El Asnam earthquake shakes northern Algeria with a maximum Mercalli intensity of X (Extreme), killing 2,633–5,000 and injuring 8,369–9,000.
 October 14 
 The Staggers Rail Act is enacted, deregulating American railroads.
 The 6th Congress of the Workers' Party ended, having anointed North Korean President Kim Il-sung's son Kim Jong-il as his successor.
 October 15 – James Callaghan announces his resignation as leader of the British Labour Party.
 October 18 – 1980 Australian federal election: Malcolm Fraser's Liberal/National Country Coalition Government is re-elected with a substantially reduced majority, defeating the Labor Party led by Bill Hayden. The Government also loses control of the Senate, with the Australian Democrats winning the balance of power.
 October 20
 Greece rejoins the NATO military structure.
 In continuous production since 1962, the last MG MGB roadster rolls off the assembly line at the Abingdon-on-Thames (England) factory, ending production for the MG Cars marque.
 October 21 – In Major League Baseball, The Philadelphia Phillies of the National League defeat the Kansas City Royals of the American League, 4–1, in Game Six of the World Series to win the championship.
 October 25 – Proceedings on the Hague Convention on the Civil Aspects of International Child Abduction conclude at The Hague.
 October 27 – Six Provisional Irish Republican Army prisoners in Maze prison in Northern Ireland refuse food and demand status as political prisoners; the hunger strike lasts until December.
 October 30 – El Salvador and Honduras sign a peace treaty to put the border dispute fought over in 1969's Football War before the International Court of Justice.
 October 31
 The Polish government recognizes Solidarity.
 Reza Pahlavi, eldest son of the Shah of Iran, proclaims himself the rightful successor to the Peacock Throne.

November 

 November 4 – 1980 United States presidential election: Republican challenger and former Governor Ronald Reagan of California defeats incumbent Democratic President Jimmy Carter and was elected the 40th President of the United States.
 November 10 – 12 – Voyager program: The NASA space probe Voyager I makes its closest approach to Saturn, when it flies within  of the planet's cloud-tops and sends the first high resolution images of the world back to scientists on Earth.
 November 20 – The Gang of Four trial begins in China.
 November 21
 A fire at the MGM Grand Hotel and Casino on the Las Vegas Strip kills 85 people.
 A record number of viewers on this date (for an entertainment program) tune into the U.S. television show Dallas to learn who shot lead character J. R. Ewing. The "Who shot J.R.?" event is an international obsession.
 November 23 – The 6.9  Irpinia earthquake shakes southern Italy with a maximum Mercalli intensity of X (Extreme).  Officially, there were 2,483 people killed and 8,934 injured, though the deaths may have been as high as 4,900.

December

 December 2 – A missionary (Jean Donovan) and three Roman Catholic nuns (Maura Clarke, Ita Ford, Dorothy Kazel), all Americans, are murdered by a military death squad in El Salvador while doing charity work during that country's civil war.
 December 8 – Murder of John Lennon: Mark David Chapman is arrested following the murder of English musician John Lennon, formerly of the Beatles, outside his New York City apartment building, The Dakota.
 December 14 – Four people are murdered and four others are injured by two armed robbers at Bob's Big Boy on La Cienega Boulevard in Los Angeles, in what is one of the city's most brutal crimes ever.
 December 15 – The Academia de la Llingua Asturiana (Academy of the Asturian language) is created.
 December 16 – During a summit on the island of Bali, OPEC decides to raise the price of petroleum by 10%.

Date unknown
 The Right Livelihood Award is founded by Jakob von Uexkull. Hassan Fathy and Plenty International/Stephen Gaskin are its first winners.
 The World Hockey Association and NHL merge, adding teams in Hartford, Quebec City, Edmonton and Winnipeg to the league. Accompanying the newly added Edmonton Oilers as the first team in Alberta, the Atlanta Flames move to Calgary.

World population

Births

January

 January 1 – Richie Faulkner, British rock guitarist 
 January 2 – Kemi Badenoch, British politician
 January 3 – Bryan Clay, American decathlete
 January 4 
 Chantal Baudaux, Venezuelan actress and model
 Greg Cipes, American voice, film and television actor
 January 5 – Li Ting, Chinese tennis player
 January 7 – Hele Kõrve, Estonian actress and singer
 January 8 – Adam Goodes, Australian rules footballer
 January 9 – Sergio García, Spanish golfer
 January 10 – Sarah Shahi, American actress 
 January 11 – Lovieanne Jung, American softball player
 January 12 – Amerie, American singer
 January 13 – Wolfgang Loitzl, Austrian ski jumper
 January 14
 Carlos Alvarado Quesada, Costa Rican politician, 48th President of Costa Rica
 Monika Kuszyńska, Polish singer and songwriter
 January 16
 Seydou Keita, Malian footballer
 Lin-Manuel Miranda, Puerto Rican-American actor, composer and writer
 Albert Pujols, Dominican Major League Baseball player
 Michelle Wild, Hungarian actress
 January 17
 Zooey Deschanel, American actress, singer and musician
 Maksim Chmerkovskiy, Ukrainian-American dance champion, choreographer and instructor
 January 18
 Estelle, British singer
 Jason Segel, American actor and comedian
 January 19
 Jenson Button, British racing driver
 Cai Yun, Chinese badminton player
 Luke Macfarlane, Canadian actor and singer
 Arvydas Macijauskas, Lithuanian basketball player
 January 20
 Philippe Gagnon, Canadian Paralympic swimmer
 Kim Jeong-hoon, South Korean singer and actor
 Matthew Tuck, Welsh singer and guitarist 
 January 21 
 Lee Kyung-won, South Korean badminton player
 Nana Mizuki, Japanese voice actress and singer
 January 22 
 Christopher Masterson, American actor and disc jockey 
 Jonathan Woodgate, English football player and coach
 January 24 – Suzy, Portuguese singer
 January 25
 Christian Olsson, Swedish athlete
 Xavi, Spanish footballer
 Michelle McCool, American professional wrestler
 January 27 – Marat Safin, Russian tennis player
 January 28 – Nick Carter, American pop singer (Backstreet Boys)
 January 29
 Yael Bar Zohar, Israeli actress and model
 Ivan Klasnić, Croatian footballer
 Jason James Richter, American actor
 January 30 – Lee Zeldin, American politician
 January 31 – Jurica Vranješ, Croatian footballer

February

 February 2 
 Oleguer Presas, Spanish footballer
 Nina Zilli, Italian singer-songwriter 
 February 6 
 Mamiko Noto, Japanese actress and singer
 Ryan Parmeter, American professional wrestler
 February 8 – Yang Wei, Chinese gymnast
 February 9 – Angelos Charisteas, Greek footballer
 February 10
 César Izturis, Venezuelan Major League Baseball player
 Steve Tully, English footballer
 February 11 – Matthew Lawrence, American actor
 February 12
 Juan Carlos Ferrero, Spanish tennis player
 Christina Ricci, American actress
 Gucci Mane, American rapper
 February 14 – Mindy Robinson, American actress and reality TV show personality
 February 15 – Petr Elfimov, Belarusian singer
 February 17 – Jason Ritter, American actor and producer
 February 18 – Regina Spektor, Russian-American singer-songwriter
 February 19
 Mike Miller, American basketball player
 Ma Lin, Chinese table-tennis player
 February 20
 Imanol Harinordoquy, French rugby player
 Artur Boruc, Polish football (soccer) goalkeeper
 February 21 
 Tiziano Ferro, Italian singer
 Jigme Khesar Namgyel Wangchuck, King of Bhutan
 February 22 – Jeanette Biedermann, German singer and actress
 February 24 
 Emma Johnson, Australian swimmer
 Shinsuke Nakamura, Japanese professional wrestler
 February 26 – Júlio César da Silva e Souza, Brazilian footballer
 February 27
 Chelsea Clinton, daughter of U.S. President Bill Clinton and U.S. Secretary of State Hillary Clinton
 Don Diablo, Dutch DJ and producer
 February 28
 Tayshaun Prince, American basketball player
 Piotr Giza, Polish footballer

March

 March 1 – Shahid Afridi, Pakistani cricketer
 March 2 – Rebel Wilson, Australian actress
 March 3 – Katherine Waterston, American actress
 March 4 
 Rohan Bopanna, Indian tennis player
 Omar Bravo, Mexican footballer
 March 5 – Jessica Boehrs, German singer and actress
 March 7
 Fabiana Alvim, Brazilian volleyball player
 Murat Boz, Turkish singer and actor
 Laura Prepon, American actress
 Mart Toome, Estonian actor
 March 10 – Chingy, American rapper, singer and actor 
 March 11 – Gabriela Pichler, Swedish film director and screenwriter
 March 12 – Juliana Silveira, Brazilian actress
 March 13 
 Caron Butler, American basketball player
 Kira Miró, Spanish actress and TV presenter
 March 14 – Aaron Brown, English footballer
 March 18 
 Natalia Poklonskaya, Russian lawyer, politician and diplomat
 Aisam-ul-Haq Qureshi, Pakistani tennis player
 Alexei Yagudin, Russian figure skater
 March 19 – Johan Olsson, Swedish cross country skier
 March 20 – Hamada Helal, Egyptian singer
 March 21 
 Ronaldinho, Brazilian footballer
 Marit Bjørgen, Norwegian cross-country skier
 Narges Rashidi, Iranian born-German actress
 March 30 – Yalın, Turkish pop singer and songwriter
 March 31
 Maaya Sakamoto, Japanese voice actress and singer
 Chien-Ming Wang, Taiwanese Major League Baseball player

April

 April – Akshata Murty, Indian heiress, businesswoman, fashion designer, and venture capitalist
 April 1 
 Randy Orton, American professional wrestler and actor
 Bijou Phillips, American actress and model
 April 3 – Suella Braverman, British politician
 April 4 – Björn Wirdheim, Swedish racing driver
 April 5 – Joris Mathijsen, Dutch footballer
 April 9 – Jerko Leko, Croatian football player and coach
 April 10
 Charlie Hunnam, English actor
 Andy Ram, Israeli tennis player
 April 12 – Brian McFadden, Irish pop singer 
 April 15 – Willie Mason, New Zealand-Australian rugby league player
 April 16
 Samir Javadzadeh, Azerbaijani singer
 Paul London, American professional wrestler
 April 17
 Brenda Villa, American water polo player
Kiril Petkov, Prime Minister of Bulgaria
 Alaina Huffman, Canadian actress
 Lee Hyun-il, South Korean badminton player
 April 18 – Laura Mennell, Canadian actress
 April 20
 Vibeke Skofterud, Norwegian cross country skier (d. 2018)
 Jasmin Wagner, German singer
 Waylon, Dutch singer
 April 21 – Rebecca Zlotowski, French film director and screenwriter 
 April 22 – Nicolas Douchez, French footballer
 April 23 
 Taio Cruz, British singer
 Małgorzata Socha, Polish actress
 Marjorie de Sousa, Venezuelan actress and model
 April 24
 Austin Nichols, American actor
 Karen Asrian, Armenian chess Grandmaster (d. 2008)
 April 25 – Alejandro Valverde, Spanish cyclist
 April 26
 Jordana Brewster, American actress and model
 Marlon King, Jamaican footballer
 Channing Tatum, American actor, producer and dancer
 April 27 – Zayed Khan, Indian actor
 April 28 – Josh Howard, American basketball player
 April 29 
 Kian Egan, Irish singer (Westlife)
 Emmad Irfani, Pakistani model and TV actor
 April 30 – Luis Scola, Argentine basketball player

May

 May 1 – Ana Claudia Talancón, Mexican actress
 May 2
 Tim Borowski, German footballer
 Ellie Kemper, American actress and comedian
 May 5
 Maia Hirasawa, Swedish pop singer
 Yossi Benayoun, Israeli footballer
 May 6 – Dimitris Diamantidis, Greek basketball player
 May 7 – Johan Kenkhuis, Dutch swimmer
 May 9
 Grant Hackett, Australian swimmer
 Carolin Kebekus, German comedian and actress
 May 12 – Rishi Sunak, Prime Minister of the United Kingdom
 May 14 – Zdeněk Grygera, Czech footballer
 May 17 – Alistair Overeem, Dutch mixed martial artist and kickboxer
 May 18 
 Michaël Llodra, French tennis player
 Ali Zafar, Pakistani music composer, singer-songwriter, painter and actor
 May 19 – Dean Heffernan, Australian footballer
 May 21 – Gotye, Belgian-Australian multi-instrumentalist and singer-songwriter
 May 22 
 Nazanin Boniadi, Iranian born-British actress
 Evelin Võigemast, Estonian actress and singer
 May 23 – Theofanis Gekas, Greek footballer
 May 24 – Cecilia Cheung, Hong Kong actress
 May 28
 Mark Feehily, Irish singer 
 Jørgen Strickert, Norwegian comedian
 May 29 
 Ilaria Bianco, Italian fencer
 Nazanin Boniadi, Iranian born-British actress
 May 30 – Steven Gerrard, English footballer

June

 June 1 – Damien Fahey, American MTV VJ, television host and drummer
 June 3 
 Amauri, Brazilian born-Italian footballer
 Tamim bin Hamad Al Thani, Emir of Qatar
 June 6 – Mmusi Maimane, South African politician
 June 8 – David Holoubek, Czech football manager
 June 10
 Matuzalém, Brazilian footballer
 Wang Yuegu, Singaporean Olympic table tennis player
 June 13
 Sarah Connor, German singer
 Florent Malouda, French footballer
 Juan Carlos Navarro, Spanish basketball player
 June 16
 Brad Gushue, Canadian curler
 Sibel Kekilli, German actress
 Joey Yung, Hong Kong singer
 June 17 – Venus Williams, American tennis player
 June 21 
 Richard Jefferson, American basketball player
 Branko Bošković, Montenegrin footballer
 June 22 – Ilya Bryzgalov, Russian ice hockey player
 June 23
 Erick Elías, Mexican actor
 Ramnaresh Sarwan, West Indian cricketer
 Manus Boonjumnong, Thai boxer
 Melissa Rauch, American actress
 June 24
 Minka Kelly, American actress
 Cicinho, Brazilian footballer
 June 25 – Philippe Lacheau, French actor, director and writer
 June 27 
 Alexander Peya, Austrian tennis player
 Kevin Pietersen, South African-English cricketer
 June 29 – Katherine Jenkins, Welsh soprano
 June 30
 Ryan ten Doeschate, Dutch cricketer
 Alireza Vahedi Nikbakht, Iranian footballer

July

 July 1
 Nelson Cruz, Dominican baseball player
 Shon Seung-mo, South Korean badminton player
 July 3
 Olivia Munn, American actress and model
 David Rozehnal, Czech footballer
 Harbhajan Singh, Indian international cricketer
 July 5
 Zayed Khan, Indian actor and producer
 Fabián Ríos, Colombian actor and model
 July 6
 Pau Gasol, Spanish basketball player
 Eva Green, French actress and model
 Jesse Jane, American adult actress
 July 7 
 Gerti Bogdani, Albanian politician
 Marika Domińczyk, Polish American actress
 Michelle Kwan, American figure skater
 July 8 – Robbie Keane, Irish footballer
 July 10
 Cláudia Leitte, Brazilian singer
 Jessica Simpson, American singer
 July 11 – Mathias Boe, Danish badminton player
 July 12 
 Irina Embrich, Estonian fencer
 Kristen Connolly, American actress
 July 13 
 Cory Mills, American politician and businessman
 Pejman Nouri, Iranian football player
 July 15
 JW-Jones, Canadian blues musician
 Julia Perez, Indonesian singer and actress (d. 2017)
 July 16
 Svetlana Feofanova, Russian pole-vaulter
 Oliver Marach, Austrian tennis player
 Adam Scott, Australian golfer
 July 17 
 Brett Goldstein, British actor, comedian and writer
 Rashid Ramzi, Moroccan-Bahraini athlete
 July 18 
 Kristen Bell, American actress
 David Blu (born David Bluthenthal), American–Israeli basketball player
 July 19
 Xavier Malisse, Belgian tennis player
 Mark Webber, American actor
 July 20 
 Gisele Bündchen, Brazilian supermodel
 Jin Goo, South Korean actor
 July 21 – CC Sabathia, American baseball player
 July 22
 Scott Dixon, New Zealand racing driver
 Dirk Kuyt, Dutch footballer
 Kate Ryan, Belgian singer-songwriter
 July 26 – Jacinda Ardern, 40th Prime Minister of New Zealand
 July 27 – Nick Nemeth, American professional wrestler
 July 29 – Fernando González, Chilean tennis player

August

 August 2 
 Nadia Bjorlin, American-Swedish actress
 Amanda Lind, Swedish politician
 August 3 
 Nadia Ali, Pakistani-American singer-songwriter
 Hannah Simone, British born-Canadian actress and model
 August 5 – Wayne Bridge, English footballer
 August 6 
 Will Pan, American-Taiwanese singer-songwriter and actor
 Roman Weidenfeller, German footballer
 August 8 – Shayna Baszler, American professional wrestler and kickboxer
 August 9 – Dominic Tabuna, Nauruan politician
 August 11 – Monika Pyrek, Polish pole vaulter
 August 16
 Julien Absalon, French mountain biker
 Vanessa Carlton, American singer
 August 17 
 Dani Güiza, Spanish footballer
 Lene Marlin, Norwegian singer and musician
 August 18 
 Esteban Cambiasso, Argentine footballer
 Damion Stewart, Jamaican footballer
 August 21 – Paul Menard, American race car driver
 August 23 – Rex Grossman, American football player
 August 26
 Macaulay Culkin, American actor
 Chris Pine, American actor
 August 29
 William Levy, Cuban-American actor
 David West, American basketball player

September

 September 1 – Lætitia Dosch, French actress
 September 3
 Jennie Finch, American softball player
 Jason McCaslin, Canadian Guitarist
 Polina Smolova, Belarusian singer
 September 5 – Marianna Madia, Italian politician
 September 6
 Samuel Peter, Nigerian boxer and heavyweight champion
 Joseph Yobo, Nigerian footballer
 September 7
 Nigar Jamal, Azerbaijani singer, Eurovision Song Contest 2011 winner
 Gabriel Milito, Argentine footballer
 September 9 
 Denise Quiñones, Puerto Rican actress, model and beauty queen who was crowned Miss Universe 2001.
 Michelle Williams, American actress
 September 10 – Mikey Way, American musician (My Chemical Romance)
 September 11 – Mike Comrie, Canadian ice hockey player
 September 12
 Roda Antar, Sierra Leonean born-Lebanese footballer
 Yao Ming, Chinese basketball player
 Hiroyuki Sawano, Japanese composer
 September 13 – Ben Savage, American actor 
 September 15 
 Jolin Tsai, Taiwanese singer
 Faiz Khaleed, Malaysian astronaut
 September 17 – Luis Horna, Peruvian tennis player
 September 19 – Tegan and Sara, Canadian twin sisters singer
 September 21 
 Kareena Kapoor, Indian actress
 Autumn Reeser, American actress
 September 24 
 Nataša Bekvalac, Serbian singer
 Sara McMann, American mixed martial artist
 John Arne Riise, Norwegian footballer
 Victoria Pendleton, English cyclist
 September 25 
 T.I., African-American rap artist, film and music producer, actor and author
 Nikola Žigić, Serbian footballer
 September 26 – Daniel and Henrik Sedin, Swedish ice hockey players
 September 28 – Elena Khrustaleva, Russian biathlete
 September 29 – Zachary Levi, American actor and singer
 September 30
 Martina Hingis, Swiss tennis player
 Guillermo Rigondeaux, Cuban boxer
 Virgil Abloh, American fashion designer and entrepreneur (d. 2021)

October

 October 4
 Me'Lisa Barber, American athlete
 Nick Mohammed, British actor and comedian
 Tomáš Rosický, Czech footballer
 October 5 
 James Toseland, English motorcycle racer
 Joakim Brodén, Swedish-Czech Singer
 October 8
 The Miz, American professional wrestler
 Nick Cannon, American comedian, rapper, and television host
 October 9 – Henrik Zetterberg, Swedish Ice Hockey player
 October 10
 Sherine, Egyptian singer
 Lynn Hung, Hong Kong actress
 October 12 – Ledley King, English footballer
 October 13
 Ashanti, American singer, songwriter, record producer, model, dancer, and actress
 Scott Parker, English footballer
 October 14 – Ben Whishaw, English actor
 October 15 – Tom Boonen, Belgian cyclist
 October 16 – Sue Bird, Israeli-American basketball player
 October 17 – Yekaterina Gamova, Russian volleyball player
 October 18 – Reetinder Singh Sodhi, Indian cricket player
 October 19 – José Bautista, Dominican baseball player
 October 21 – Kim Kardashian, American socialite and television personality 
 October 24
 Monica, American singer, songwriter, actress, and businesswoman
 Casey Wilson, American actress and comedian
 October 26 – Cristian Chivu, Romanian football player and coach
 October 28 – Natina Reed, American singer and rapper (d. 2012)
 October 29 – Ben Foster, American actor
 October 30 
 Sarah Carter, Canadian actress
 Eva Wahlström, Finnish boxer
 October 31 – Kengo Nakamura, Japanese footballer

November 

 November 5
 Luke Hemsworth, Australian actor
 Christoph Metzelder, German footballer 
 November 6 
 Pål Sverre Hagen, Norwegian actor
 Anri Jokhadze, Georgian pop singer
 November 7 – Gervasio Deferr, Spanish gymnast
 November 8 – Luís Fabiano, Brazilian footballer
 November 9 – Vanessa Lachey, American television personality, fashion model, and beauty queen
 November 10 
 Calvin Chen, Taiwanese pop singer
 Maya Diab, Lebanese singer, actress and TV presenter
 November 11 – Nicole Malliotakis, American politician
 November 12
 Ryan Gosling, Canadian actor and musician
 Gustaf Skarsgård, Swedish actor
 November 13 – Stalin González, Venezuelan lawyer and politician
 November 15 – Kevin Staut, French equestrian
 November 16 
 Kayte Christensen, American basketball player
 Alexa Havins, American actress
 November 18 – François Duval, Belgian rally driver
 November 21
 Hiroyuki Tomita, Japanese gymnast
 Elaine Yiu, Hong Kong actress
 November 26 – Satoshi Ohno, Japanese singer
 November 28 
 Lisa Middelhauve, German singer (Xandria)
 Christian Poulsen, Danish footballer
 November 29
 Janina Gavankar, American actress and musician
 Ilias Kasidiaris, Greek politician

December 

 December 1 – Yianna Terzi, Greek singer and songwriter
 December 3 
 Anna Chlumsky, American actress
 Jenna Dewan, American actress and dancer
 December 5 – Ibrahim Maalouf, Lebanese-born French trumpeter
 December 7 – John Terry, English footballer
 December 9 – Simon Helberg, American actor, comedian and musician
 December 10 – Sarah Chang, American violinist
 December 13 – Bosco Wong, Hong Kong actor
 December 14 – Didier Zokora, Ivorian footballer
 December 15 – Annalena Baerbock, German politician
 December 18
 Christina Aguilera, American singer, songwriter, actress and television personality
 Mark Essien, Nigerian entrepreneur, founder of Hotels.ng
 December 19 – Jake Gyllenhaal, American actor
 December 20 
 Ashley Cole, English footballer
 Martín Demichelis, Argentine footballer
 December 21 – Stefan Liv, Swedish ice hockey player (d.2011)
 December 23 – Yadira Caraveo, American politician
 December 30 – Eliza Dushku, American actress
 December 31 – Richie McCaw, New Zealand rugby player

Deaths

January

 January 1 
 Adolph Deutsch, American composer (b. 1897)
 Pietro Nenni, Italian politician (b. 1891)
 Frank Wykoff, American Olympic athlete (b. 1909)
 January 2 – Alessandro Bruschetti, Italian artist (b. 1910)
 January 3 – Joy Adamson, Austrian-born conservationist and author (b. 1910; murdered)
 January 6 – Piersanti Mattarella, President of Sicily (b. 1935; assassinated)
 January 7 – Simonne Mathieu, French tennis champion (b. 1908)
 January 8 – John Mauchly, American physicist and inventor (b. 1907)
 January 11 – Barbara Pym, English novelist (b. 1913)
 January 13 – Andre Kostelanetz, Russian conductor and arranger (b. 1901)
 January 18 – Sir Cecil Beaton, English photographer (b. 1904)
 January 21 – Georges Painvin, French cryptographer (b. 1886)
 January 22
 Walter Pym, Australian actor (b. 1905)
 Teresa Noce, Italian labor leader, activist, and journalist (b. 1900)
 January 24 – Lil Dagover, German actress (b. 1887)
 January 27
 Hans Aeschbacher, Swiss sculptor (b. 1906)
 Peppino De Filippo, Italian actor (b. 1903)
 January 28 – Franco Evangelisti, Italian composer (b. 1926)
 January 29 – Jimmy Durante, American actor, singer and comedian (b. 1893)
 January 30
 Maria Bolognesi, Italian Roman Catholic laywoman, mystic and blessed (b. 1924)
 Professor Longhair, American musician (b. 1918)
 January 31 – Eduardo Cáceres, Guatemalan politician (b. 1906)

February

 February 2
 Hanna Rovina, Russian-born Israeli actress (b. 1889)
 William Howard Stein, American chemist, Nobel Prize laureate (b. 1911)
 February 7 – Sir Richard Williams, Royal Australian Air Force officer (b. 1890)
 February 8
 Nikos Xilouris, Greek pop singer (b. 1936)
 Francesco Zucchetti, French Olympic cyclist (b. 1902)
 February 10 – Wels Eicke, Australian rules football player (b. 1893)
 February 11 – R. C. Majumdar, Indian historian (b. 1884)
 February 13 – David Janssen, American actor (b. 1931)
 February 14 – Luitkonwar Rudra Baruah, Assamese composer and actor (b. 1926)
 February 17 – Graham Sutherland, English artist (b. 1903)
 February 19
 Robert Morrison, British Olympic rower (b. 1902)
 Bon Scott, Scottish-born Australian rock singer (AC/DC)  (b. 1946)
 February 20 – Alice Roosevelt Longworth, American writer and socialite (b. 1884)
 February 21 – Aldo Andreotti, Italian mathematician (b. 1924)
 February 22 – Oskar Kokoschka, Austrian painter and poet (b. 1886)
 February 23 – Enrico Celio, Swiss politician, 49th President of the Swiss Confederation (b. 1889)
 February 24
 Michael Browne, Irish Roman Catholic prelate (b. 1895)
 Clement Martyn Doke, South African linguist (b. 1893)
 February 26 – Mario Mattoli, Italian director and screenwriter (b. 1898)
 February 27 – Shin'ichi Hisamatsu, Japanese philosopher (b. 1889)
 February 29 – Yigal Allon, Israeli politician and army general (b. 1918)

March

 March 1
 Dixie Dean, English football player (b. 1907)
 Daniil Khrabrovitsky, Soviet film director (b. 1923)
 Wilhelmina, Dutch-born American high-fashion model and owner of model agency (b. 1940)
 March 5 – Jay Silverheels, Canadian actor (b. 1912)
 March 6 – Barbara Brukalska, Polish architect (b. 1899)
 March 9 
 Nikolay Bogolyubov, Soviet and Russian actor (b. 1899)
 Olga Chekhova, Russian-German actress (b. 1897)
 March 13 – Roland Symonette, 1st Premier of the Bahamas (b. 1898)
 March 14
 Anna Jantar, Polish singer (b. 1950)
 Mohammad Hatta, Indonesia's first vice president (b. 1902)
 Félix Rodríguez de la Fuente, Spanish naturalist and television presenter (b. 1928)
 March 17 – Boun Oum, 4th Prime Minister of Laos (b. 1911)
 March 18
 Elsa Goveia, Guyanese-born Jamaican scholar (b. 1925)
 Erich Fromm, German-born psychologist and philosopher (b. 1900)
 Louise Lovely, Australian actress (b. 1895)
 Tamara de Lempicka, Polish-born painter (b. 1898)
 March 24
 Pierre Etchebaster, French real tennis player (b. 1893)
 Óscar Romero, Salvadorian Roman Catholic archbishop (b. 1917)
 March 25
 Erminio Macario, Italian actor (b. 1902)
 Walter Susskind, Czech conductor (b. 1913)
 Milton H. Erickson, American psychiatrist (b.1901)  
 March 26 – Roland Barthes, French literary critic and writer (b. 1915)
 March 28
 Helena Bochořáková-Dittrichová, Czechoslovak illustrator (b. 1894)
 Dick Haymes, Argentine actor and singer (b. 1918)
 March 29 – Mantovani, Italian-born conductor and arranger (b. 1905)
 March 30 – Tôn Đức Thắng, 2nd President of the Democratic Republic of Vietnam (North Vietnam) (b. 1888)
 March 31
 Vladimír Holan, Czech poet (b. 1905)
 Jesse Owens, American Olympic athlete (b. 1913)

April

 April 6 – Nils Ericson, Swedish actor (b. 1906)
 April 10 – Kay Medford, American actress and singer (b. 1919)
 April 11 – Ümit Kaftancıoğlu, Turkish writer (b. 1935)
 April 12
 Clark McConachy, New Zealand snooker and billiards player (b. 1895)
 William Tolbert, 20th President of Liberia (b. 1913)
 April 13 – Karl Stegger, Danish actor (b. 1913)
 April 15 – Jean-Paul Sartre, French philosopher and writer, Nobel Prize laureate (b. 1905)
 April 20 – Helmut Käutner, German director (b. 1908)
 April 21 – Sohrab Sepehri, Persian poet and painter (b. 1928)
 April 22 
 Jane Froman, American singer and actress (b. 1907)
 Fritz Strassmann, German chemist (b. 1902)
 April 24 – Alejo Carpentier, Cuban writer (b. 1904)
 April 26 – Cicely Courtneidge, British actress (b. 1893)
 April 27 – Mario Bava, Italian director (b. 1914)
 April 29 – Alfred Hitchcock, British film director (b. 1899)
 April 30 – Luis Muñoz Marín, the first elected Governor of Puerto Rico (1949 to 1965) (b. 1898)

May

 May 2
 George Pal, Hungarian-born animator and producer (b. 1904)
 May 4
 Kay Hammond, English actress (b. 1909)
 Josip Broz Tito, Yugoslav communist military and political leader, 19th Prime Minister of Yugoslavia and 1st President of Yugoslavia (b. 1892)
 May 5 – Isabel Briggs Myers, American psychological theorist and co-creator of the Myers-Briggs Type Indicator (b. 1897)
 May 9
 Prince Himalaya of Nepal (b. 1921)
 Kate Molale, South African anti-apartheid activist (b. 1928)
 May 12 – Lillian Roth, American actress (b. 1910)
 May 14
Carl Ebert, German theatre and opera director (b. 1887)
Hugh Griffith, Welsh actor (b. 1912)
Fatmawati, inaugural First Lady of Indonesia (b. 1923)
 May 16 – Marin Preda, Romanian writer (b. 1922)
 May 18
 David A. Johnston, American volcanologist (b. 1949) (killed by eruption of Mount St. Helens)
 Ian Curtis, English musician and singer (b. 1956)
 Reid Blackburn, photojournalist for National Geographic (b. 1952; also killed by eruption of Mount St. Helens)
 Harry R. Truman, owner/operator of Mt. St. Helens Lodge (b. 1896; killed by eruption of Mount St. Helens)
 May 20 – Jack Walsh, Australian cricketer (b. 1912)
 May 21 – Ida Kamińska, Polish-born Jewish actress, playwright and translator (b. 1899)
 May 28 – Rolf Nevanlinna, Finnish mathematician (b. 1895)

June

 June 1 – Rube Marquard, American baseball player (New York Giants) and a member of the MLB Hall of Fame (b. 1886)
 June 2 – Stanley Forman Reed, American lawyer and politician (b. 1884)
 June 6 – Gualtiero De Angelis, Italian actor and voice actor (b. 1899)
 June 7
 Lillian Dean, Australian photographer and local politician (b. c.1899)
 Philip Guston, American painter (b. 1913)
 Henry Miller, American writer (b. 1891)
 Marian Spychalski, Polish architect and politician, former head of State (b. 1908)
 June 8
 Ernst Busch, German singer and actor (b. 1900)
 Alfredo Brilhante da Costa, Brazilian football player (b. 1904)
 June 9 – Shyam Kumari Khan, Indian lawyer (b. 1904)
 June 12
 Billy Butlin, South African-born Canadian founder of Butlins Holiday Camps (b. 1899)
 Masayoshi Ōhira, Japanese politician, 43rd Prime Minister of Japan (b. 1910)
 June 13 – Walter Rodney, Guyanese historian and political figure (b. 1942)
 June 14 – Sante Spessotto, Italian Roman Catholic priest and saint (b. 1923)
 June 18 – Terence Fisher, British director (b. 1904)
 June 21 – Bert Kaempfert, German orchestra leader and songwriter (b. 1923)
 June 22 – Joseph Cohen, British solicitor, property developer, cinema magnate and Jewish community leader (b. 1889)
 June 23
 Clyfford Still, American painter (b. 1904)
 V. V. Giri, Indian politician and 4th President of India (b. 1894)
 June 24 – Boris Kaufman, Russian cinematographer (b. 1897)
 June 26 – Syriac Orthodox Patriarch of Antioch Ignatius Jacob III (b. 1912)
 June 28 – José Iturbi, Spanish conductor and musician (b. 1895)
 June 29 – Jorge Basadre, Peruvian historian (b. 1903)

July

 July 1 – C. P. Snow, British physicist and novelist (b. 1905)
 July 3
 Deng Hua, Chinese general (b. 1910)
 Abdelhamid Sharaf, 51st Prime Minister of Jordan (b. 1939)
 July 4 – Gregory Bateson, British anthropologist, anthropologist, social scientist, linguist, semiotician and cyberneticist (b. 1904)
 July 6 – Gail Patrick, American actress (b. 1911) 
 July 7 – Prince Dmitri Alexandrovich of Russia (b. 1901)
 July 8 – Rudolf Creutz, Austrian criminal (b. 1896)
 July 9 – Vinicius de Moraes, Brazilian writer, poet and diplomat (b. 1913)
 July 10 – Leonidas Zervas, Greek organic chemist (b. 1902)
 July 12 – John Warren Davis, American educator, college administrator, and civil rights leader (b. 1888)
 July 13 – Seretse Khama, 1st President of Botswana (b. 1921)
 July 17 – Boris Delaunay, Russian mathematician (b. 1890)
 July 19 – Nihat Erim, Turkish politician and jurist, 30th Prime Minister of Turkey (b. 1912)
 July 20 – Lado Gudiashvili, Soviet painter (b. 1896)
 July 21 – Salah al-Din al-Bitar, Syrian politician, 2-time Prime Minister of Syria (b. 1912)
 July 22 – Hans-Georg Bürger, German racing driver (b. 1952)
 July 24 – Peter Sellers, British comedian and actor (b. 1925)
 July 25 – Vladimir Vysotsky, Soviet singer-songwriter, poet and actor (b. 1938)
 July 26 – Kenneth Tynan, English theatre critic (b. 1927)
 July 27 – Mohammad Reza Pahlavi, Shah of Iran (b. 1919)
 July 28 – Maria Luisa Monteiro da Cunha, Brazilian librarian (b. 1908)
 July 30 – Lucien Dalsace, French actor (b. 1893)
 July 31 – Pascual Jordan, German physicist (b. 1902)

August

 August 1 – Patrick Depailler, French racing driver (b. 1944)
 August 4 – Ioan Arhip, Romanian general (b. 1890)
 August 9
 Harry Bell, Australian footballer (b. 1897)
 Jacqueline "Jackie" Cochran, American pilot (b. 1906)
 August 10 
 Gareth Evans, British philosopher (b. 1946)
 Yahya Khan, Pakistani general and statesman, 3rd President of Pakistan (b. 1917)
 August 14 – Dorothy Stratten, Canadian actress and model (b. 1960) 
 August 18 – Arman, Iranian-born Soviet actor (b. 1921)
 August 19 – Otto Frank, German father of Jewish diarist Anne Frank (b. 1889)
 August 20 – Joe Dassin, American-born French singer-songwriter (b. 1938)
 August 22 – Gabriel González Videla, 24th President of Chile (b. 1898)
 August 25 – Gower Champion, American theatre director, choreographer and dancer (b. 1919)
 August 26 – Tex Avery, American animator and director (b. 1908)
 August 29 – Franco Basaglia, Italian psychiatrist and professor (b. 1924)

September

 September 3
 Barbara O'Neil, American actress (b. 1909)
 Dirch Passer, Danish actor (b. 1926)
 September 4
 Pepe Abad, Spanish-born Chilean television presenter and radio host (b. 1932)
 George Murray Burnett, British mathematician and chemist (b. 1921)
 September 5 – Don Banks, Australian composer (b. 1923)
 September 8 – Willard Libby, American chemist, Nobel Prize laureate (b. 1908)
 September 9 – Manzoor Ali Khan, Pakistani classical singer (b. 1922)
 September 12 – Lillian Randolph, American actress (b. 1898)
 September 13 – Victoria Nyame, Ghanaian politician
 September 14 – Domingo Acedo, Spanish football player (b. 1898)
 September 15 – Bill Evans, American jazz pianist (b. 1929)
 September 16 – Jean Piaget, Swiss psychologist (b. 1896)
 September 17 – Anastasio Somoza Debayle, President of Nicaragua 1967–72, 1974-79 (b. 1925)
 September 18 – Katherine Anne Porter, American author (b. 1890)
 September 19 – Sol Lesser, American film producer (b. 1890)
 September 23 – Jacobus Johannes Fouché, 5th President of South Africa (b. 1898)
 September 25
 John Bonham, British rock drummer (Led Zeppelin) (b. 1948)
 Lewis Milestone, American film director (b. 1895)
 Marie Under, Estonian poet (b. 1883)

October

 October 2 – John Kotelawala, Sri Lanka soldier and politician, 3rd Prime Minister of Ceylon (b. 1895)
 October 6 – Hattie Jacques, British actress (b. 1922)
 October 7 – Sydney Gordon Russell, English designer and craftsman (b. 1892)
 October 10 – Elizabeth Rummel, German-Canadian mountaineer and environmental activist (b. 1897)
 October 12 – Alberto Demicheli, Uruguayan political figure, former president of Uruguay (de facto) (b. 1896)
 October 15 – Prince Peter of Greece and Denmark (b. 1908)
 October 18 – Hans Ehard, German lawyer and politician (b. 1887)
 October 21
 Hans Asperger, Austrian pediatrician after whom Asperger syndrome was named (b. 1906)
 Valko Chervenkov, Bulgarian Communist leader and statesman, 34th Prime Minister of Bulgaria (b. 1900)
 Edelmiro Julián Farrell, Argentine general, 28th President of Argentina (b. 1887)
 October 23
Tibor Rosenbaum, Hungarian-born Swiss rabbi and businessman (b. 1923)
Mariano Suárez, Ecuadorian politician, 27th President of Ecuador (b. 1897)
 October 25
Virgil Fox, American organist (b. 1912)
 Víctor Galíndez, Argentine boxer (b. 1948)
 Sahir Ludhianvi, Urdu/Hindustani poet and Hindi film lyricist (b. 1921)
 October 26 – Marcelo Caetano, Portuguese politician and scholar, 101st Prime Minister of Portugal (b. 1906)
 October 27
 Steve Peregrin Took, British rock musician (b. 1949)
 John Hasbrouck Van Vleck, American physicist, Nobel Prize laureate (b. 1899)
 October 29 – Giorgio Borġ Olivier, Maltese politician and statesman, 7th Prime Minister of Malta (b. 1911)
 October 31 – Jan Werich, Czech actor, playwright and writer (b. 1905)

November

 November 4
 Elsie MacGill, Canadian aeronautical engineer (b. 1904)
 Johnny Owen, Welsh professional boxer (b. 1956)
 November 7 – Steve McQueen, American actor (b. 1930)
 November 9
 Gloria Guinness, Mexican-born American fashion icon (b. 1912)
 November 10 – Marion Allnutt, welfare worker and full-time secretary and commanding officer of the NGO, Women's Australian National Services (WANS) (b. 1896)
 November 14 – Jeanne Halbwachs, French pacifist, feminist and socialist (b. 1890)
 November 16
 Boris Aronson, Russian set designer (b. 1898)
 Imogen Hassall, English actress (b. 1942)
 November 18 – Conn Smythe, Canadian NHL coach (b. 1895)
 November 20
 Avtandil Gogoberidze, Soviet football player (b. 1922)
 Sir John McEwen, Australian politician, 18th Prime Minister of Australia (b. 1900)
 November 21 – Sara García, Mexican actress (b. 1895)
 November 22
 Norah McGuinness, Northern Irish painter and illustrator (b. 1901)
 Mae West, American actress (b. 1893)
 Leonard Barr, American stand-up comic, actor, and dancer (b. 1903)
 November 24 
George Raft, American actor (b. 1901)
Molly Reilly, Canadian aviator (b. 1922)
 November 25 – Herbert Flam, American tennis player (b. 1928)
 November 26 – Rachel Roberts, British actress (b. 1927)
 November 27 – F. Burrall Hoffman, American architect (b. 1882)
 November 29
 Dorothy Day, American journalist, activist, Roman Catholic convert and Servant of God (b. 1897)
 Babe London, American actress and comedian (b. 1901)

December

 December 2 – Romain Gary, Lithuanian-born writer (b. 1914)
 December 3 – Sir Oswald Mosley, British fascist leader (b. 1896)
 December 4
 Francisco de Sá Carneiro, Portuguese lawyer, 109th Prime Minister of Portugal (b. 1934)
 Stanisława Walasiewicz, Polish-born runner (b. 1911)
 December 7 – Darby Crash, American rock songwriter, singer (b. 1958)
 December 8 – John Lennon, English singer-songwriter and guitarist (b. 1940)
 December 10 – Patriarch Benedict I of Jerusalem (b. 1892)
 December 12 – Bruno Bartolozzi, Italian composer (b. 1911)
 December 14 – Nichita Smochină, Moldovan activist (b. 1894)
 December 16
 Colonel Sanders, American fast-food entrepreneur (b. 1890)
 Hellmuth Walter, German engineer and inventor (b. 1900)
 Peter Collinson, British film director (b. 1936)
 December 18
 Alexei Kosygin, Soviet politician, Premier of the Soviet Union (b. 1904)
 Sir Albert Margai, 2nd Prime Minister of Sierra Leone (b. 1910)
 December 19 – Héctor José Cámpora, Argentine Peronist politician, 38th President of Argentina (b. 1909)
 December 21 – Marc Connelly, American playwright (b. 1890)
 December 24
 Karl Dönitz, German admiral and 4th President of Germany (b. 1891)
 Heikki Liimatainen, Finnish Olympic athlete (b. 1894)
 December 29 – Tim Hardin, American musician (b. 1941)
 December 31
 Marshall McLuhan, Canadian author and professor (b. 1911)
 Raoul Walsh, American film director (b. 1887)

Date unknown
 Nureddine Rifai, 25th Prime Minister of Lebanon (b. 1899)

Nobel Prizes

 Physics – James Watson Cronin, Val Logsdon Fitch
 Chemistry – Paul Berg, Walter Gilbert, Frederick Sanger
 Medicine – Baruj Benacerraf, Jean Dausset, George D. Snell
 Literature – Czesław Miłosz
 Peace – Adolfo Pérez Esquivel
 Economics – Lawrence Klein

References 

 
Leap years in the Gregorian calendar